Wonder Women! The Untold Story of American Superheroines is a 2012 documentary film exploring the concept of heroic women from the birth of the superhero in the 1940s to the TV and big screen action blockbusters of today.

Cast
Lynda Carter
Jane Espenson
Kathleen Hanna
L.S. Kim
Shelby Knox
Carmela Lane
Mike Madrid
Andy Mangels
Katie Pineda
Trina Robbins
Gloria Steinem
Jennifer K. Stuller
Lindsay Wagner

References

External links
 
 

2012 films
Documentary films about comics
Documentary films about women in film
Wonder Woman in other media
SModcast Pictures films
2010s English-language films